The Department of Social and Health Services (DSHS) is Washington's social services department. The agency has its headquarters in Office Building Two (OB-2) in Olympia, the state capital. Annually, 2.2 million children, families, vulnerable adults and seniors come to the department for protection, comfort, food assistance, financial aid, medical and behavioral health care and other services.

Juvenile Rehabilitation Administration
The Juvenile Rehabilitation Administration (JRA) is an administration within the DSHS that operates juvenile correctional facilities.

The secure institutions include:
 Echo Glen Children's Center (unincorporated King County, near Snoqualmie) – Serves younger males and the majority of females in JRA custody
 Green Hill School (Chehalis)
 Naselle Youth Camp (unincorporated Pacific County, near Naselle) – Males only
 Camp Outlook (Connell)

Mental Health 
Official WA State Mental Health Page
MHD-PI WA State Mental Health Performance Indicators and Usage Reports

Controversies 
 Wenatchee child abuse prosecutions
 $2.5 million settlement to abuse survivors

References

External links

 

Social and Health Services
Penal system in Washington (state)
Juvenile detention centers in the United States
State corrections departments of the United States
State departments of health of the United States
Medical and health organizations based in Washington (state)